Henrique Salas Römer (born 17 April 1936 in Puerto Cabello, Carabobo, Venezuela) is a Venezuelan economist from Yale University, politically active in Venezuela since 1983.

Political career
He was elected to congress as a member of the COPEI party in 1983, and then re-elected. In 1989 he was elected governor of his home state Carabobo and re-elected in 1992.

In 1998, he ran for the presidency of Venezuela as the candidate of Project Venezuela, a national party developing out of Römer's regional Project Carabobo party. Four days before the election, the two main political parties in Venezuela at the time, COPEI and Democratic Action, switched their support to him. In the election, he was runner-up to Hugo Chávez, garnering 40% of the vote in a six-man race. As an outcome of his presidential campaign,  he founded a new political organization,  Proyecto Venezuela.

References

External links 
 "El empresario.(Internacional)", Reforma (México D.F., México), December 6, 1998

1936 births
Living people
Governors of Carabobo
Project Venezuela politicians
Venezuelan people of German descent